Touch Sensitive is the solo project of Michael Di Francesco, an Australian producer and musician from Sydney, also known as a member of Van She.

His debut single "Body Stop" was released in 2004. Touch Sensitive's 2013 single "Pizza Guy" attained popularity in an advertisement for Very.

In September 2017, Touch Sensitive released the debut album Visions. Visions debuted and peaked at number 48 on the Australian ARIA Charts.

Touch Sensitive has remixed songs from artists such as Rüfüs, Hayden James. He is a common sight at Australian Music festivals, such as Falls Festival, Listen Out, and Hot Dub Wine Machine.

Discography

Studio albums

Extended plays

Singles

Awards and nominations

AIR Awards
The Australian Independent Record Awards (commonly known informally as AIR Awards) is an annual awards night to recognise, promote and celebrate the success of Australia's Independent Music sector.

|-
| AIR Awards of 2018
| "Lay Down"
| Best Independent Dance/Electronic Club Song or EP
| 
|-

References

Internal link
 
 SoundCloud
 Youtube
 Twitter

Musicians from Sydney
Australian electronic musicians
21st-century Australian musicians
Living people
21st-century Australian male musicians
Year of birth missing (living people)